Beasts of the Southern Wild is a 2012 American fantasy drama film directed by Benh Zeitlin, written by Zeitlin and Lucy Alibar, and produced by Dan Janvey, Josh Penn and Michael Gottwald from Alibar's one-act play Juicy and Delicious. The film won the Caméra d'Or award at the 2012 Cannes Film Festival after competing in the Un Certain Regard section. It also won the Grand Jury Prize: Dramatic at the 2012 Sundance Film Festival, where it premiered, and the Grand Jury Prize at the 2012 Deauville American Film Festival. The film went on to earn the Los Angeles Film Festival's Audience Award for Best Narrative Feature and the Seattle International Film Festival's Golden Space Needle Award for Best Director. In October, it was announced that the film had won the Sutherland Trophy for Most Innovative Debut.  On January 10, 2013, the film was nominated for four Oscars, in the categories of Best Picture, Best Director (Benh Zeitlin), Lead Actress (Quvenzhané Wallis), and Adapted Screenplay (Lucy Alibar & Benh Zeitlin).

References

External links
 

Lists of accolades by film